Parametritis (also known as pelvic cellulitis) is an infection of the parametrium (connective tissue adjacent to the uterus). It is considered a form of pelvic inflammatory disease.

References

External links 

Inflammatory diseases of female pelvic organs